Newbern Historic District is a national historic district located at Newbern, Pulaski County, Virginia. It encompasses 47 contributing buildings in the town of Newbern.  It includes a variety of residential, commercial, and institutional buildings dated as early as the early-19th century.  Notable buildings include the Adam Hance House, known locally as the "Summer Resort," Duncan-Meredith House, Colley house, the Haney Tavern, Vermillion and Stone's store, the Christian Church (1860), and Old Jail (1839).

It was added to the National Register of Historic Places in 1979.

References

Historic districts in Pulaski County, Virginia
Queen Anne architecture in Virginia
National Register of Historic Places in Pulaski County, Virginia
Historic districts on the National Register of Historic Places in Virginia